The Battle of Gdow (Polish language: Bitwa pod Gdowem) took place on February 26, 1846 near Gdow, Free City of Krakow. It was the only battle of the Krakow Uprising: a 380-strong rebel unit commanded by Jakub Suchorzewski was defeated by a 480-strong Austrian Army detachment under Ludwig von Benedek. The Austrians were supported by some 500 local peasants (see Galician slaughter). Rebel losses were estimated at 154 killed in action, while Austrian losses were negligible.

Background 
After the Krakow Uprising had begun, an Austrian detachment under Colonel Ludwig von Benedek left Tarnów, heading towards Krakow. Von Benedek had almost 500 men, including 330 infantry and 150 cavalry. Along the way, his unit was reinforced by local peasants from several villages, such as Marszowice, Nieznanowice and Pierzchow. The peasants were promised a hundredweight of salt and 5 Cracow zlotys for each captured rebel.

Battle 
Meanwhile, a rebel unit of 380 men (mostly residents of Cracow and local szlachta) under Colonel Jakub Suchorzewski concentrated in Lazany, 8 km southeast of Wieliczka. In the morning of the February 26, insurgents reached Gdów and they scattered around the town seeking food. Bolesław Limanowski wrote that Suchorzewski didn't expect the Austrians to trace him so quickly and that is why he allowed his soldiers to rest. Whereas, Suchorzewski himself headed to a local manor for a meal, so that he presumably even wasn't in Gdów during the battle.

The Austrian troops at first met a few insurgents who were standing on guard over the bridge on Raba. They started shooting to each other but Poles retreated quickly to the centre of Gdów, where they warned the rest of insurgents about the approaching enemy. Those, in most cases drunk, chaotically escaped from inn and houses, crowding in the town centre. Meanwhile von Benedek launched a flanking manoeuvre and surrounded a unit of kosynierzy near the cemetery's wall. They were then attacked by furious peasants and only few were saved by the Austrians who intervened too late. Suchorzewski himself fled to Dobczyce, taking with him rebel money.

Altogether, rebel losses were 154: all were buried in three pits, dug at the cemetery. Survivors fled to Krakow, while on the next day the Austrians entered Wieliczka.

References

Sources 
 Mała Encyklopedia Wojskowa, 1967, Wydanie I
 Jerzy Zdrada, Historia Polski 1795-1914, Warszawa 2007
 Julius Kreipner, Geschichte des K.und K.Infanterie-Regimentes Nr. 34 für immerwährende Zeiten Wilhelm I. Deutscher Kaiser und König von Preussen, 1733-1900, Kosice 1900

See also 
 Austrian Poland
 Revolutions of 1848

1846 in Poland
1846 in the Austrian Empire
Conflicts in 1846
Uprisings of Poland
Military history of the Habsburg monarchy
History of Kraków
February 1846 events